Jennifer Daniel is an American artist, designer and art director. She leads the Emoji Subcommittee for The Unicode Consortium and has worked for The New York Times and The New Yorker.

Life and career 
Daniel grew up in Kansas. Since she was a teenager, Daniel has chronicled her life in sketchbook form documenting quotable moments with her family alongside grid drawings. She graduated from the Maryland Institute College of Art and then worked at the New York Times. She later taught creative writing at the School of Visual Arts in New York City. From September 2009 to July 2011, she worked in a studio space at the Pencil Factory in Greenpoint, Brooklyn.

In 2015, her first children's book Space! was published. Two more books followed: The Origin of (Almost) Everything (2016) which included an introduction from Stephen Hawking. Later, How to Be Human (2017) was published.

Daniel is a member of the Art Director's Club. Her work has been recognized by the Society of Illustrators.

Unicode and emoji work 
Daniel’s first contribution to Unicode Standard was standardizing gender inclusive representations in emoji. She created the Mrs Claus, Woman in Tuxedo, Man in Veil and 30 other gender-inclusive emoji. In addition to her work for the Unicode Consortium, Daniel serves as the Expressions Creative Director for Android and Google.

Daniel has authored and co-authored over two dozen emoji including: 🥲🥹🫡🫢🫣🫤🫥🫠😮‍💨😶‍🌫️😵‍💫🫧❤️‍🔥❤️‍🩹🫂🫦🫱🫲🫰🫱🏿‍🫲🏻🫅🧑‍🍼🫄🫗🪫

References

External links 
 

Year of birth missing (living people)
Living people
American illustrators
Maryland Institute College of Art alumni
School of Visual Arts faculty